David Wenham (born 1945) is a British theologian and Anglican clergyman, who is the author of several books on the New Testament.

Early life and education
David Wenham was born in 1945, the son of theologian John Wenham. He was brought up in Durham and Bristol. He studied theology at Pembroke College, Cambridge, graduating with a Bachelor of Arts (BA) degree in 1967; as per tradition, his BA was later promoted to a Master of Arts (MA Cantab) degree. He undertook doctoral research under F. F. Bruce at the University of Manchester, completing his Doctor of Philosophy (PhD) degree in 1970.

He is a brother of Gordon Wenham.

Career

Academic career
After becoming the Theological Students' Secretary with the UCCF he taught at Union Biblical Seminary in India before returning to become the Director of Tyndale House's Gospels Research Project. Whilst in Cambridge he completed part-time ordination training at Ridley Hall, Cambridge, before moving to the staff of Wycliffe Hall in the University of Oxford. He was the tutor in New Testament at Wycliffe Hall from 1983 to 2007 and served under four different principals. He was also dean (2002 to 2005) and vice principal (2005 to 2006).

In 2007, he was appointed as Senior Tutor in New Testament at Trinity College, Bristol. His brother Gordon Wenham also lectures there on a part-time basis. From 2008 to 2012, he was also vice principal of the college. Since 2012, he has been a part-time tutor in the New Testament.

He is particularly interested in questions to do with the origins and historical reliability of the gospels. He is involved in helping people to understand the first century context of Jesus and the early church, and to get students to be intelligently and responsibly excited about the New Testament (and equipped to teach it to others). He has written many publications including "The Parables of Jesus" (IVP), a guide to the teaching of Jesus and his most recent book "Paul and Jesus: the true story" (SPCK/Eerdmans) an introduction to Paul, looking at questions of history and theology in the book of Acts, Paul's letters and the gospels.

Ordained ministry
In 1981, Wenham began part-time training at Ridley Hall, Cambridge, an Evangelical Anglican theological college, in preparation for ordained ministry. He was ordained in the Church of England as a deacon in 1984 and as a priest in 1985. From 1996 to 2002, he was a non-stipendiary minister (NSM) in the Benefice of Shelswell in the Diocese of Oxford. From 2003 to 2007, he was an NSM at St Michael's Church, Cumnor. between 2007 and 2013, he concentrated on his academic career and did not hold any dedicated ministry positions. He returned to St Michael's Church, Cumnor in 2013, and serves as a NSM in his semi-retirement.

Personal life
David is married to Clare and they have two adult sons.

Books
Gospel Perspectives. Continuum International Publishing Group, 1984.
The Parables of Jesus. Downers Grove, IL: IVP, 1989.
Paul: Follower of Jesus or Founder of Christianity?. Cambridge: Eerdmans, 1995.
D. Wenham and S. Walton. Exploring the New Testament (2 Volumes). London: SPCK: 2001.
Paul and Jesus: The True Story. London: SPCK, 2002.
Did Paul Get Jesus Right? The Gospel According to Paul. Oxford: Lion, 2010.

References

1945 births
Living people
Christian writers
Alumni of Ridley Hall, Cambridge
British theologians
20th-century English Anglican priests
21st-century English Anglican priests
Alumni of Pembroke College, Cambridge
Alumni of the University of Manchester
Staff of Trinity College, Bristol